Pyridazine is an aromatic, heterocyclic, organic compound with the molecular formula . It contains a six-membered ring with two adjacent nitrogen atoms. It is a colorless liquid with a boiling point of 208 °C. It is isomeric with two other diazine rings, pyrimidine and pyrazine.

Occurrence
Pyridazines are rare in nature, possibly reflecting the scarcity of naturally occurring hydrazines, common building blocks for the synthesis of these heterocycles. The pyridazine structure is a popular pharmacophore which is found within a number of herbicides such as credazine, pyridafol and pyridate. It is also found within the structure of several drugs such as cefozopran, cadralazine, minaprine, pipofezine, and hydralazine.

Synthesis
In the course of his classic investigation on the Fischer indole synthesis, Emil Fischer prepared the first pyridazine via the condensation of phenylhydrazine and levulinic acid. The parent heterocycle was first prepared by oxidation of benzocinnoline to the pyridazinetetracarboxylic acid followed by decarboxylation. A better route to this otherwise esoteric compound starts with the maleic hydrazide. These heterocycles are often prepared via condensation of 1,4-diketones or 4-ketoacids with hydrazines.

References

 
Simple aromatic rings